Weeley railway station is on the Sunshine Coast Line, a branch of the Great Eastern Main Line, in the East of England, serving the village of Weeley, Essex. Its three-letter station code is WEE.

The station was opened by the Tendring Hundred Railway, a subsidiary of the Great Eastern Railway, in 1866. It is currently managed by Greater Anglia, which also operates all trains serving the station.

History
The station was opened on 8 January 1866 by the Tendring Hundred Railway, a subsidiary of the Great Eastern Railway.

The original level crossing beside the station was replaced by a flyover as part of the first Weeley by-pass in the 1930s.

In 2011 the station received a minor facelift, which included the addition of an accessible ramp with hand rails, updated warning signs, and a clean-up. In 2014 a footbridge of modular steel construction connecting the platforms was installed, replacing the old concrete structure.

Since the original station building has been disused for many years, in 2016 it was reported that the franchisee, Greater Anglia, planned to demolish it and provide platform shelters in its place. The buildings were subsequently offered to Tendring District Council for £1 each, should the council wish to renovate them.

Services
Due to its low patronage – the lowest of all the stations on the Sunshine Coast Line – Weeley is closed on Sundays. There are some additional services running to and from London Liverpool Street and Clacton-on-Sea during peak hours.

References

External links

Original station house

Railway stations in Essex
DfT Category F2 stations
Former Great Eastern Railway stations
Railway stations in Great Britain opened in 1866
Greater Anglia franchise railway stations
1866 establishments in England
Tendring